The Gendarm (German and French (gendarme) for police officer), but also known as eastern Breithorn Twin is a peak of the Pennine Alps, located on the border between Switzerland and Italy, between the canton of Valais and the region of Aosta Valley. It is part of the Breithorn range, located east of the Theodul Pass. It is located just east of its other twin, the western Breithorn Twin, and west of the Roccia Nera.

References

External links
Breithornzwillinge on Hikr

Alpine four-thousanders
Mountains of the Alps
Mountains of Italy
Mountains of Switzerland
Pennine Alps
Italy–Switzerland border
International mountains of Europe
Mountains of Valais
Four-thousanders of Switzerland